Immanuel Church is church located in the city centre of Stockholm, Sweden. The church was designed by Sture Frölén and built in 1974 on a lot that used to house a tram depot, at the intersection of Birger Jarlsgatan and Kungstensgatan. 

The entire block, containing offices and a hotel, was built in the years 1970–1974 on behalf of the church. The church has been considered a fine example of 1970s modernist architecture and is of great historical value, according to the Stockholm City Museum.

See also
 List of churches in Stockholm

References

External links 

 

Churches in Stockholm
Churches completed in 1974
Modernist architecture in Sweden
Lutheran churches in Sweden
Uniting Church in Sweden churches